Antiochus IV Epiphanes (Antíochos ho Epiphanḗs, "God Manifest"; c. 215 BC  – November/December 164 BC) was a Greek Hellenistic king who ruled the Seleucid Empire from 175 BC until his death in 164 BC.  He was a son of King Antiochus III the Great.  Originally named Mithradates (alternative form Mithridates), he assumed the name Antiochus after he ascended the throne.  Notable events during Antiochus's reign include his near-conquest of Ptolemaic Egypt, his persecution of the Jews of Judea and Samaria, and the rebellion of the Jewish Maccabees.

Antiochus's accession to the throne was controversial, and he was seen as a usurper by some.  After the death of his brother Seleucus IV Philopator in 175 BC, the "true" heir should have been Seleucus's son Demetrius I.  However, Demetrius I was very young and a hostage in Rome at the time, and Antiochus seized the opportunity to declare himself king instead, successfully rallying enough of the Greek ruling class in Antioch to support his claim.  This helped set a destabilizing trend in the Seleucid Empire in subsequent generations, as an increasing number of claimants tried to usurp the throne.  After his own death, power struggles between competing lines of the ruling dynasty heavily contributed to the collapse of the empire.

Antiochus' often eccentric behaviour and capricious actions during his interactions with common people, such as appearing in the public bathhouses and applying for municipal offices, led some of his contemporaries to call him Epimanes (Ἐπιμανής, Epimanḗs, "The Mad"), a wordplay on his title Epiphanes.

Biography

Rise to power
Antiochus, born around 215 BC, was a son of the Seleucid king Antiochus III the Great. As a potential successor to the throne, he became a political hostage of the Roman Republic under the terms of the Treaty of Apamea, concluded in 188 BC. After his older brother Seleucus IV Philopator followed their father onto the throne in 187 BC, Antiochus was exchanged for his nephew Demetrius I Soter, the son and heir of Seleucus. After this Antiochus lived in Athens, and was there when his brother was assassinated in 175 BC.

Seleucus was assassinated in September 175 BC by the government minister Heliodorus.  Heliodorus proclaimed himself regent afterward, essentially giving himself control of the government.  This arrangement did not last long.  With the help of king Eumenes II of Pergamum, Antiochus IV traveled from Athens through Asia Minor and reached Syria by November 175 BC. Seleucus' legitimate heir Demetrius I Soter was still a hostage in Rome, so Antiochus seized the throne for himself, proclaiming himself co-regent with another son of Seleucus, an infant named Antiochus.  (Antiochus, son of Seleucus IV would later die in 170 BC, possibly murdered by Antiochus IV).

Ruling style
Antiochus IV cultivated a reputation as an extravagant and generous ruler.  He scattered money to common people in the streets of Antioch; gave unexpected gifts to people he did not know; contributed money to the Temple of Zeus at Athens and the altar at Delos; put all his Western military forces on a massive parade at Daphne, a suburb of Antioch; and held opulent banquets with the aristocracy using the best spices, clothing, and food.  He also supplemented the Seleucid army with mercenaries.  All of this cost the Seleucid treasury, but the Empire was apparently able to raise enough taxes to pay for all this.  His eccentric behavior and unexpected interactions with common people such as appearing in the public bath houses and applying for municipal offices led his detractors to call him Epimanes (Ἐπιμανής, Epimanḗs, "The Mad"), a word play on his title Epiphanes ("God Manifest").

Wars against Egypt and relations with Rome

After his ascension Antiochus took care to maintain good relations with the Roman Republic, sending an embassy to Rome in 173 BC with a part of the unpaid indemnity still owed from the 188 BC Treaty of Apamea. While there the embassy secured a renewed treaty of friendship and alliance with Rome, greatly helped by the fact Antiochus had come to power with the help of Eumenes II, Rome's principal ally in the region.

The guardians of King Ptolemy VI Philometor demanded the return of Coele-Syria in 170 BC, declaring war on the Seleucids on the assumption that the kingdom was divided after Antiochus' murder of his nephew. However Antiochus had warning of the attack and had prepared more thoroughly.  He had already built his forces and moved them into position; as soon as the Egyptian forces left Pelusium they were attacked and defeated by Antiochus IV and his Seleucid army.  The Seleucids then seized Pelusium, giving them supplies and access to all of Egypt.  He advanced into Egypt proper, conquering all but Alexandria and capturing King Ptolemy. This was partially achieved because Rome (Ptolemaic Egypt's traditional ally) was embroiled in the Third Macedonian War and was not willing to become involved elsewhere.

To avoid alarming Rome, Antiochus allowed Ptolemy VI to continue ruling as a puppet king from Memphis. Upon Antiochus' withdrawal, the city of Alexandria chose a new king, one of Ptolemy's brothers, also named Ptolemy (VIII Euergetes). The Ptolemy brothers reconciled and agreed to rule Egypt jointly instead of fighting a civil war.

In 168 BC, Antiochus led a second attack on Egypt and also sent a fleet to capture Cyprus. Before he reached Alexandria, his path was blocked by a single elderly Roman ambassador named Gaius Popillius Laenas who delivered a message from the Roman Senate directing Antiochus to withdraw his armies from Egypt and Cyprus or consider himself in a state of war with the Roman Republic.  Antiochus said he would discuss it with his council, whereupon the Roman envoy drew a line in the sand around Antiochus and said: "Before you leave this circle, give me a reply that I can take back to the Roman Senate." This implied Rome would declare war if the King stepped out of the circle without committing to leave Egypt immediately. Weighing his options, Antiochus decided to withdraw. Only then did Popillius agree to shake hands with him.  Ancient sources and traditional historiography describe this "Day of Elesius" as a great humiliation for Antiochus IV that unhinged him for a time.  Some more modern historians conjecture that Antiochus may have been more reconciled to this than ancient sources indicate, as the Roman intervention meant that Antiochus had been given an excuse to not undertake a potentially long and costly siege of Alexandria.  He could instead return with treasure and loot having weakened the Egyptian state at little risk and cost compared to a larger-scale invasion.

Persecution of Jews

The Seleucids, like the Ptolemies before them, held a suzerainty over Judea: they respected Jewish culture and protected Jewish institutions. This policy was drastically reversed by Antiochus IV, seemingly after what was either a dispute over leadership of the Temple in Jerusalem and the office of High Priest, or possibly a revolt whose nature was lost to time after being crushed.  Antiochus issued decrees forbidding many traditional Jewish practices and began a campaign of persecution against devout Jews. Swine were strictly unclean to Jews, but Diodorus wrote, Antiochus "sacrificed a great swine at the image of Moses, and at the altar of God that stood in the outward court, and sprinkled them with the blood of the sacrifice. He commanded likewise that the books, by which they were taught to hate all other nations, should be sprinkled with the broth made of the swine's flesh. And he put out the lamp (called by them immortal) which burns continually in the temple. Lastly he forced the high priest and the other Jews to eat swine's flesh" (Diodorus 34:1(4)). Such steps triggered a revolt against his rule, the Maccabean Revolt. Scholars of Second Temple Judaism therefore sometimes refer to Antiochus' reign as the 'Antiochene crises' for the Jews.  These decrees were a departure from typical Seleucid practice, which did not attempt to suppress local religions in their empire.

Books of Maccabees

Local revolts against the Seleucid Empire were not unusual, but most were not successful.  The revolt that Antiochus IV had triggered in Judea was unusually well chronicled and preserved, however.  According to the book of 2 Maccabees, while Antiochus was campaigning in Egypt, a rumor spread that he had been killed. In Judea, the deposed High Priest Jason gathered a force of 1,000 soldiers and made a surprise attack on the city of Jerusalem. Menelaus, the High Priest appointed by Antiochus, was forced to flee Jerusalem during a riot. King Antiochus returned from Egypt in 168 BC, enraged by his defeat; he attacked Jerusalem and restored Menelaus, then executed many Jews.
 
After restoring Menelaus, Antiochus IV issued decrees aimed at helping the most enthusiastically pro-Greek faction of Jews (usually called "Hellenizers") against the traditionalists.  He outlawed Jewish religious rites and traditions and the Temple in Jerusalem was changed to a syncretic Greek-Jewish cult that included worship of Zeus.  The city of Jerusalem was sacked a second time in the disorder.  Antiochus established a military Greek citadel called the Acra in Jerusalem to serve as a stronghold for Hellenized Jews and a Greek military garrison.  This happened from 168–167 BC.

Traditionally, as expressed in the First and Second Books of the Maccabees, the Maccabean Revolt was painted as a national resistance to a foreign political and cultural oppression. In modern times, however, scholars have argued that Antiochus IV was more intervening in a civil war between the traditionalist Jews in the country and the Hellenized Jews in Jerusalem.

The revolt also led to the writing of the Book of Daniel, where a villain called the "King of the North" is generally considered to be a reference to Antiochus IV.  The portrayal of Antiochus there attacking the holy city of Jerusalem but eventually meeting his end would influence later Christian depictions of the Antichrist.

Final years

King Mithridates I of Parthia took advantage of Antiochus' western problems and attacked from the east, seizing the city of Herat in 167 BC and disrupting the direct trade route to India, effectively splitting the Greek world in two.

Antiochus recognized the potential danger in the east but was unwilling to give up control of Judea. He sent a commander named Lysias to deal with the Maccabees, while the King himself led the main Seleucid army against the Parthians. Antiochus had initial success in his eastern campaign, capturing king Artaxias and reconquering Armenia. His campaign went through Ecbatana and he attacked Persepolis, being driven off by the populace. On his return home, he died at Isfahan in 164 BC.

Various religious explanations exist of Antiochus IV's death.  Apparently, he attacked a temple of the Mesopatamian deity Nanaya in Persia shortly before his demise, and his death was possibly attributed to impiety and punishment by Nanaya in some quarters.  Jewish sources gave credit for Antiochus's death to his earlier impiety at the Temple of Jerusalem.  According to 2 Maccabees, he died from divinely-inflicted disease:

According to the later rabbinical work, the scroll of Antiochus (Megillat Antiochus), when Antiochus heard that his army had been defeated in Judea, he boarded a ship and fled to the coastal cities. Wherever he came the people rebelled and called him "The Fugitive," so he drowned himself in the sea.  This story is from the 2nd century, however, much further removed from the event than Polybius or 2 Maccabees.

Legacy

Jewish tradition

Antiochus IV is remembered as a major villain and persecutor in the Jewish traditions associated with Hanukkah, including the books of Maccabees and the "Scroll of Antiochus". Rabbinical sources refer to him as הרשע harasha ("the wicked"); the Jewish Encyclopedia concluded that "[s]ince Jewish and heathen sources agree in their characterization of him, their portrayal is evidently correct", summarizing this portrayal as one of a cruel and vainglorious ruler who tried to force on all the peoples of his realm a Hellenic culture, "the true essence of which he can scarcely be said to have appreciated". Whether Antiochus' policy was directed at extermination of Judaism as a culture and a religion, though, is debatable on the grounds that his persecution was limited to Judea and Samaria (Jews in the diaspora were exempt), and that Antiochus was hardly an ideologically motivated Hellenizer. Erich S. Gruen suggests that, instead, he was driven more by pragmatics such as the need to gather income from Judea.

Divine epithets 
Antiochus was the first Seleucid king to use divine epithets on coins, perhaps inspired by the Bactrian Hellenistic kings who had earlier done so, or else building on the ruler cult that his father Antiochus the Great had codified within the Seleucid Empire. These epithets included  "manifest god", and, after his defeat of Egypt,  "bringer of victory".

Historiography
While much of the ancient sources are hostile to Antiochus IV, including non-Jewish ones, some modern historians are skeptical of them as well.  The historian Polybius was a friend of Demetrius I, who had little love for his uncle, and was more generally a bit of an elitist, so stories such as those of Antiochus IV frolicking with commoners at taverns may have soured his reputation in antiquity in a way that modern values would find unobjectionable.  The historian Dov Gera writes in defense of Antiochus IV that he was a "talented and accomplished politician" and that "the negative portrait of him painted by Polybius was influenced by political considerations of his friends... and should not be trusted."

Genealogy

See also

 Abomination of desolation
 List of fictional Antichrists
 List of people who have been considered deities
 List of Syrian monarchs
 Timeline of Syrian history

References

External links

 Antiochus IV Ephiphanes entry in historical sourcebook by Mahlon H. Smith
 Antiochus IV Epiphanes at livius.org
 Antiochus IV entry in 'Seleucid Genealogy'

210s BC births
164 BC deaths
Year of birth uncertain
2nd-century BC Babylonian kings
2nd-century BC Seleucid rulers
2nd-century BC biblical rulers
Antisemitism in Greece
Antisemitism in Syria
Deified people
Antiochus 04
People in the deuterocanonical books
Seleucid people in the books of the Maccabees
Antiochus 04
History of Hanukkah